Amadea may refer to:

People
 Amadea Palaiologina of Monferrato (1418–1440), queen consort and wife of king John II of Cyprus
 Princess Amadea Reuss of Köstritz
 Hon. Miranda Amadea Chaplin (born 1956), daughter of Anthony Chaplin, 3rd Viscount Chaplin
 Amadea Fredonia (1631–1633), daughter of Julius Frederick, Duke of Württemberg-Weiltingen
 Amadea Qureta, a 2018 contestant on The Voice Kids Indonesia (season 3)

Fictional characters
 Amadea, a version of Cinderella, from The Coachman Rat
 Amadea, a fictional hen from Sauerkraut (TV series)

Other uses
 Amadea (ship), several ships of the name
 , a cruise ship owned by Amadea Shipping Company and operated by Phoenix Reisen
 M/Y Amadea, a superyacht built by Lürssen and owned by Russian oligarch Suleyman Kerimov
 Amadea Resort, part of the Prime Plaza Hotels and Resorts in Indonesia

See also

 Amadeus (name), whose feminine form is Amadea
 Amadeans, a Roman Catholic religious order of monks, followers of Amadeus of Portugal

 Amadeus (disambiguation)
Amadee (disambiguation)
Amadeo (disambiguation)
Amédée (disambiguation)
Amedeo (disambiguation)